Nusrat Iqbal Sahi (born 14 March 1950) is a Pakistani sprinter. He competed in the men's 200 metres at the 1972 Summer Olympics.

References

External links
 

1950 births
Living people
Athletes (track and field) at the 1972 Summer Olympics
Pakistani male sprinters
Olympic athletes of Pakistan
Place of birth missing (living people)
Asian Games medalists in athletics (track and field)
Asian Games bronze medalists for Pakistan
Athletes (track and field) at the 1974 Asian Games
Medalists at the 1974 Asian Games
20th-century Pakistani people